Anna Louise DeForge (born April 14, 1976) is an American-Montenegrin professional female basketball player who most recently played for the Detroit Shock in the WNBA. She is the first player from the University of Nebraska to ever play in the WNBA. After finding little success and playing time for several WNBA teams, she finally earned a spot on a WNBA All-Star team in 2004. She was one of the players selected to play in the historic WNBA vs. USA Basketball Game.

On February 3, 2006, she was traded to the Indiana Fever from the Phoenix Mercury in exchange for Kelly Miller.

On February 19, 2008 DeForge signed on with the Minnesota Lynx.

On February 27, 2009 DeForge signed on with the Beşiktaş Istanbul.

WNBA career statistics

Regular season

|-
| align="left" | 200
| align="left" | Detroit
| 27 || 10 || 16.0 || .405 || .321 || .781 || 1.7 || 1.7 || 1.0 || 0.1 || 1.2 || 5.4
|-
| align="left" | 2003
| align="left" | Phoenix
| 34 || 27 || 31.3 || .412 || .412 || .725 || 3.1 || 2.1 || 1.5 || 0.4 || 1.6 || 11.9
|-
| align="left" | 2004
| align="left" | Phoenix
| 34 || 34 || 33.9 || .417 || .387 || .863 || 3.6 || 3.1 || 1.5 || 0.2 || 2.0 || 14.4
|-
| align="left" | 2005
| align="left" | Phoenix
| 33 || 33 || 34.3 || .390 || .326 || .850 || 3.5 || 2.4 || 1.2 || 0.2 || 2.5 || 13.1
|-
| align="left" | 2006
| align="left" | Indiana
| 34 || 34 || 29.3 || .393 || .378 || .818 || 4.3 || 2.2 || 1.1 || 0.3 || 1.6 || 10.2
|-
| align="left" | 2007
| align="left" | Indiana
| 34 || 34 || 23.4 || .418 || .410 || .906 || 3.3 || 1.5 || 0.8 || 0.1 || 1.4 || 8.7
|-
| align="left" | 2008
| align="left" | Minnesota
| 34 || 34 || 24.9 || .391 || .364 || .763 || 3.0 || 1.7 || 0.8 || 0.1 || 0.9 || 8.5
|-
| align="left" | 2009
| align="left" | Detroit
| 7 || 7 || 16.1 || .278 || .000 || .000 || 2.9 || 1.4 || 0.6 || 0.0 || 1.0 || 1.4
|-
| align="left" | Career
| align="left" | 8 years, 4 teams
| 237 || 213 || 27.6 || .403 || .374 || .821 || 3.2 || 2.1 || 1.1 || 0.2 || 1.6 || 10.2

Playoffs

|-
| align="left" | 2006
| align="left" | Indiana
| 2 || 2 || 32.0 || .333 || .250 || .000 || 3.5 || 1.5 || 0.5 || 0.0 || 0.0 || 6.0
|-
| align="left" | 2007
| align="left" | Indiana
| 6 || 6 || 32.8 || .467 || .393 || 1.000 || 3.7 || 1.0 || 1.3 || 0.2 || 1.5 || 16.8
|-
| align="left" | Career
| align="left" | 2 years, 1 team
| 8 || 8 || 32.6 || .444 || .361 || 1.000 || 3.6 || 1.1 || 1.1 || 0.1 || 1.1 || 14.1

Nebraska statistics

Source

Personal
Born to Rosemary and Roger DeForge in Iron Mountain, Michigan, she played at Niagara High School in Niagara, Wisconsin. DeForge majored in Business Administration at the University of Nebraska.

Career highlights
Selected to start the 2007 WNBA All-Star for the Eastern Conference by the WNBA Fans
Selected to play in the WNBA vs. USA Basketball Game at Radio City Music Hall in 2004
Won the National Women's Basketball League Championship with the Dallas Fury in 2004
2005-2006:  Honored as league (PLKK) MVP . The Polish TS Wisla Can-Pack Krakow team won the Women's PLKK Championship Series.
2006-2007:  Her Polish TS Wisła Can-Pack Kraków team won the Women's PLKK Championship Series.
2007-2008:  Her Polish TS Wisła Can-Pack Kraków team won the Women's PLKK Championship Series.
2022 Spring Season: Won the Brewtown Recreation Co-Ed Flag Football League Championship with Beer Bellys.

References

External links
 
 www.annadeforge.pl

1976 births
Living people
American women's basketball players
Montenegrin women's basketball players
American emigrants to Montenegro
American expatriate basketball people in Poland
American expatriate basketball people in Turkey
Basketball players from Michigan
Basketball players from Wisconsin
Detroit Shock players
Indiana Fever players
Minnesota Lynx players
Nebraska Cornhuskers women's basketball players
People from Iron Mountain, Michigan
People from Marinette County, Wisconsin
Phoenix Mercury players
Shooting guards
Women's National Basketball Association All-Stars
Beşiktaş women's basketball players
Abdullah Gül Üniversitesi basketball players
Undrafted Women's National Basketball Association players